The 2008 Danish Individual Speedway Championship was the 2008 edition of the Danish Individual Speedway Championship. The final was staged over two rounds, at Holsted and Outrup, and was won by Nicki Pedersen. It was Pedersen's fifth national title, taking him level with Erik Gundersen in third place on the all-time list.

Semi-final

Final series

Final classification

References 

Denmark